Agyneta prosectoides is a species of sheet weaver found in Cameroon and Nigeria. It was described by Locket & Russell-Smith in 1980.

References

prosectoides
Endemic fauna of Nigeria
Spiders of Africa
Spiders described in 1980